Nicholsina is a genus of marine ray-finned fishes, parrotfishes from the family Scaridae. They are found in the Atlantic and eastern Pacific Oceans. The generic name honours the American ichthyologist John Treadwell Nichols (1883-1958) who was curator of fishes at the American Museum of Natural History.

Species
There are currently three species classified in the genus:

Nicholsina collettei Schultz 1968
Nicholsina denticulata (Evermann & Radcliffe, 1917) (Loosetooth parrotfish)
Nicholsina usta (Valenciennes, 1840) (Emerald parrotfish)

References

Scaridae
Taxa named by Henry Weed Fowler
Ray-finned fish genera